Jerome Pierre (born 28 September 1939) is a Dominican cricketer. He played in three first-class matches for the Windward Islands in 1965/66.

See also
 List of Windward Islands first-class cricketers

References

External links
 

1939 births
Living people
Dominica cricketers
Windward Islands cricketers